Sabrina Cervantes (born October 24, 1987) is an American politician serving as a member of the California State Assembly. A Democrat, she represents the 58th Assembly District, which encompasses the northwestern Riverside County city of Jurupa Valley and portions of the cities of Corona, Eastvale, and the City of Riverside, as well as the San Bernardino County city of Grand Terrace.

Cervantes was first elected to the State Assembly in November 2016 to represent the 60th Assembly District after defeating incumbent Republican Eric Linder. In 2019, she became the first member of the California State Legislature to give birth to triplets while serving in office.

Early life and education
Cervantes was born and raised in Riverside County, California. She earned a Bachelor of Arts in political science with a minor in public policy from the University of California, Riverside. She also completed an Executive Education program at the Kennedy School of Government at Harvard University.

Career 
Before being elected, Cervantes served as a District Director for a member of the California State Assembly, and the Director of the California Voter Project. She also worked in the private sector alongside various community organizations to enhance the local economy, broaden access to quality education, and improve access to governmental services. She is currently a member of the Human Rights Campaign, The PICK Group of Young Professionals, and serves on the Advisory Board for the University of California, Riverside School of Public Policy. She has previously served on the board of directors for the UCR Chicano Latino Alumni Association, and non-profit organizations TruEvolution and Women Wonder Writers.

Cervantes is a member of the California Latino Legislative Caucus, the California Legislative Women's Caucus, and the California Legislative LGBT Caucus.

She is the Chair of the Assembly Committee on Jobs, Economic Development, and the Economy; and the Assembly Select Committee on Veteran Employment and Education. Cervantes is also a member of the Assembly committees on Banking & Finance; Communications & Conveyance; and Public Employees & Retirement.

2016 California State Assembly election

2018 California State Assembly election

2020 California State Assembly election

2022 California State Assembly election

Personal life
Cervantes lives in Corona, California, with her wife who works as a hospital technician.

References

External links 
 
 Campaign website
 Join California Sabrina Cervantes

Democratic Party members of the California State Assembly
Living people
1987 births
University of California, Riverside alumni
Women state legislators in California
Hispanic and Latino American state legislators in California
Hispanic and Latino American women in politics
LGBT state legislators in California
LGBT Hispanic and Latino American people
Lesbian politicians
21st-century American politicians
21st-century American women politicians